Omoforovo is a rural locality (a village) in Kopninskoye Rural Settlement, Sobinsky District, Vladimir Oblast, Russia. The population was 44 as of 2010.

Geography 
Omoforovo is located 15 km west of Sobinka (the district's administrative centre) by road. Gnusovo is the nearest rural locality.

References 

Rural localities in Sobinsky District